Turkmenistan  Tennis Federation (TTF) is the governing body for professional and amateur tennis in Turkmenistan, was founded in 1993.  It was originally accepted as member at the ITF in 2003. In 2004 became the full member of Asian Tennis Federation.

Turkmenistan  Tennis Federation operates all of the Turkmenistan  national representative tennis sides, including the Turkmenistan  Davis Cup team, the Turkmenistan  Fed Cup team and youth sides as well. TTF is also responsible for organizing and hosting all types of tennis tournaments in the Turkmenistan.

References

National members of the Asian Tennis Federation
Tennis in Turkmenistan
Tennis
1993 establishments in Turkmenistan
Sports organizations established in 1993